Polivalentes Futebol Clube is an Angolan football club based in the Palanca neighborhood in Kilamba Kiaxi, Luanda. They currently play in Gira Angola the Angolan Second Division.

Stadium
Currently the team plays at the Estádio dos Coqueiros.

League & Cup Positions

Honours
28 de Agosto cup: 2013

Manager history

Players

See also
 Girabola

References

External links

Football clubs in Angola
Sports clubs in Angola